Economics film is a film genre that features economics and its social implications as a central theme. The genre contains fiction, non-fiction, documentary and educational films. It is a broad category, with some films explicitly focussing on economic theory while others explore the broader impacts of it. Films often centre around a historical event like the global financial crisis or a famous businessperson such as William Randolph Hearst or Michael Burry. Classification of films into the genre was unclear for many years, as they either were purely educational, or the inclusion of economic content was overshadowed by other genre-defining features.

Common subject matter involving economic films are diverse. The genre often explores the essential themes related to economics such as money, wealth, materialism, greed, profiteering, power, corporatism, economic inequality, corporate criticism, anti-corporate activism, corporate corruption, and dishonesty. Though economic films are socially conscious and focussed on many aspects related to the business world, many other films are focussed on extreme wealth, lavishness, self-indulgence, materialism, and luxury. Politics and the political spectrum is a major component of all economics films.

History

Second World War and the 1940s

The earliest economics film is Michael Polanyi's Unemployment and Money: The Principles Involved (1940). The educational film consisted entirely of animation and voiceover. The film is about Keynesian Economics, going into detail about currency in circulation and trade cycles. While technically this film is an educational film, it popularised the idea that economic themes and education could have widespread appeal, and that it wasn't just for scholars and the elite. From this film, directors were inspired to create films that either directly educated viewers about economics, or used economic concepts as thematic material.

In the years following Polanyi's film, other major films that incorporated economic ideas were released to critical acclaim and box office success. These films featured an economic concept as a central plot device; however, they lacked the economic detail and educational intent of Polanyi's film. Instead, they focussed on social themes like wealth inequality and materialism. The theme that money can't buy happiness and that family and love transcended financial struggle really resonated with audiences, especially during and after the hardships endured in World War II.

Citizen Kane, considered by many critics as one of the best movies of all time was released in 1941. The film is loosely based on William Randolph Hearst, a publishing businessman and politician of the 1900s. The film follows the financial rise and fall of its titular Charles Foster Kane, and the associated economic, political and personal circumstances that caused it. The film portrays the mental and emotional states of Kane throughout his life, and maps these against his status and wealth. The close of the film sees Kane long for his childhood, suggesting that despite his fortune the happiest days of his life were independent to his wealth and success.

Later that decade came the release of It's a Wonderful Life in 1946. The story follows a man named George Bailey burdened with a family business beset by economic issues to the point where he contemplates suicide and wishes he was never born. An angel shows him a vision of the reality that would’ve been had he never existed. George realises the impact he has had on others and thus the love they return for him, despite the financial issues he faces. The film was a box office success, and the FBI even labelled it as communist propaganda for the way it depicted bankers and businesspeople as sleazy.

Remainder of the 20th Century

These films exemplify the somewhat unclear role that economics film would have for the majority of the 20th century. Films would either be explicitly educational, or they would feature economics as a backdrop or a plot device rather than an iconic feature. Economic ideas were a potent influence in many major successes like Star Wars and James Bond. However, these films iconic styles and aspects usually far outshined the impact of economics on the film, hence they are classified as sci-fi or action films. The economic film genre lacked the identifying features of its contemporaries like setting, cinematography, plot and character development.

This would continue until the release of the film Wall Street (1987 film). The film revolves around a young stockbroker Bud Fox who idolises the Wall Street trader Gordon Gekko. Bud increasingly compromises his morals and the law chasing money trading stocks under Gekko's advice. The film didn't just rely on economics as a backdrop but rather prominently featured it by portraying the world of finance as exciting and risky. It made it seem that if you were smart and dedicated that you could make a fortune. The film was also a reasonably accurate depiction of what life on Wall Street was like. This was a genre-defining film, as it placed economics at the forefront and made it enticing and personally relatable, however it also warned that it could lead to greed, addiction and excess. The importance placed on wealth and materialism above all else would eventually become a major theme for economic films.

"I was always shocked when so many people who saw Wall Street said that I (Gekko) was the person who influenced them and inspired them to go into investment banking. I'd say to people, 'Well, I was the villain,' and they would say, 'No, no, no', they didn't see me that way, so it was all very seductive I guess."					- (Douglas, 2018)

Subgenres

From here the genre can be clearly divided into two sections: documentary style economics film and mainstream economics film.

Documentary economics

In the 1990s, economic documentaries also started to gain popularity, almost entirely due to the success of Michael Moore's directorial debut, Roger & Me. At the time the film was the highest grossing documentary of all time, a record that would only be broken by himself with the documentary Fahrenheit 9/11, which is the worlds’ highest grossing documentary to this day.

Documentary economics films followed many of the conventions of documentary films: they were hosted by a main presenter who narrated and guided the film, and consisted of a collection of interviews, narrator exposition and montages. Documentary economics films simply included an economic theory or impact as the central subject matter for the film, but this was complicated by Michael Moore's filmmaking. In the case of Roger & Me the subject was the outsourcing of labour to cheaper ununionized Mexican workers by General Motors that economically ravaged his hometown of Flint, Michigan. Moore took several liberties with the conventions of documentaries, mainly displaying himself as an everyday ‘working class hero’, avoiding the usual professionalism and authoritative nature seen by documentary presenters. He also presented the film as a humorous chronological series of events, typical more of a vlog than a documentary. The documentary even has a ‘plot’: a quest to get an interview with the CEO of General Motors, the titular Roger Smith (executive). All of these decisions worked greatly in his favour, as the film effortlessly portrayed General Motors as a greedy corporation manipulating economics for major profit with no concern for the economic impacts on individuals, let alone an entire town. The film was polarising, sparking heated debate on its validity and narrative, which ironically fuelled its popularity further, even leading to Roger Smith the CEO of General Motors resigning. The film's reception exemplified the inextricable link between the political spectrum and economic issues, cementing that a political narrative is the central force behind any economics documentary film.

This trend of economic documentary films being politically contentious continued throughout Moore's career, and also through the entire genre. Major entries in this genre have included: The Corporation, Inequality for All and Capitalism: A Love Story.

Mainstream economics film

Modern mainstream economic films share the same narrative springboard of an economic event, theory or idea. The shift to a fictional, narrative focus takes some of the political tension out of the films, however the films are usually based on real events, resulting in similarly polarised responses to the films. Despite being very cinematically different from documentary economics films, the inextricable link between politics and economic issues remains the driving force behind both the discourse surrounding, and the success of mainstream economics films.

Mainstream economic films are generally set in an office within a busy city, with particular emphasis on the fast-paced, boiler room (business) nature of the work. The part of the financial sector or economic mechanism utilised varies from film to film, but often involves a scheme with the capability to produce enormous amounts of money. The characters usually then fall into one of two camps; those that crave the excess and luxury and will cross legal and moral lines to get there, and those that want to help businesses or accrue funds for altruistic reasons. The same can be said for economic television shows, such as Mad Men and Suits (American TV series), however these tend to focus on interpersonal and office dynamics as well. While underpinning economic themes are still found in a considerable amount of modern cinema, there have been far less true mainstream economic films than their documentary counterparts. The major entries to the genre have been Moneyball, The Wolf of Wall Street and The Big Short.

Martin Scorsese's The Wolf of Wall Street is the 332nd highest grossing film of all time and is the prime example of the glorification of excess and gluttony displayed in economics films. The film follows Jordan Belfort, a young investor who lands a short-lived job on Wall Street. His brief glimpse into high end investing shows a culture of drugs and luxury and he is told by his direct superior that a broker's only goal is to make money for himself. He eventually ends up trading penny stocks, utilising his charismatic and energetic personality to convince buyers to invest enormous amounts of money into generally worthless stocks. This culminates in Belfort opening his own firm, which is hugely successful, and he makes more money than he knows what to do with. The majority of the film then shows the absurd things they spend money on, ranging from a mountain of drugs to wildly inappropriate office parties and even superyachts. While the film was generally received as entertaining, audiences were split on whether the absurd excess was something to admire or to be horrified by. Despite Belfort being so addicted to drugs he drove away his family and ended up in prison, many still admire the film and actively desire the lifestyle portrayed in it. Scorsese himself was motivated to create the film out of anger towards the modern-day realisation of the American dream, “I remember being told it was about opportunity and the pursuit of happiness. Not happiness itself, but the pursuit.” The fierce online discourse around the film mirrored reception of many of Moore's films, but on a much larger scale thanks to its Blockbuster success; its revenue tripled that of Fahrenheit 9/11.

The commercial success of The Wolf of Wall Street exemplified the potential for success in its subject matter of economics, something The Big Short focussed on far more so than its predecessor. The film follows a collection of different savvy investors who predicted the Global Financial Crisis, and thus made enormous amounts of money through it. The film breaks the fourth wall to explicitly explain certain economic theories that motivate the investors’ actions. While the film uses the potential for financial gain as dramatic material as opposed to exploring the results of its success like The Wolf of Wall Street does, the film nevertheless largely ignores the social consequences of economic manipulation. Brad Pitt's character Ben Rickert scolds his younger apprentice investors, reminding them that for their bet to be realised millions of Americans would have to become unemployed and potentially lose their homes. Despite this sobering moment the film rarely brings up these consequences again. Audiences were once again divided politically, arguing whether circumstances like this should be artificially prevented by government intervention, or whether a robust economy should have the opportunity to be exploited by those who are intelligent enough to do so.

List

See also
Economics

References 

 
Film genres